First and Last is an 2018 American documentarian non-scripted reality television series on Netflix. It is recorded at Gwinnett County Jail, a pre-trial holding facility in Georgia, U.S., with each episode following inmates on their first or last days in jail. The criminal justice system in America is also explored throughout the season.

The full season of First and Last consisting of six episodes was released on September 7, 2018.

Cast
 Shantee G.
 Alex R.
 Velma S.

Release
It was released on September 7, 2018, on Netflix streaming.

References

External links 
 
 
 

Netflix original documentary television series
English-language Netflix original programming